Love All is the first novel by the journalist, writer and artist Molly Parkin, originally published in 1974.

Publication history
The book was originally submitted as a 750-word outline to publishers Blond & Briggs.  Although editorial staff disliked it, a secretary commented that she liked it, and it was picked up for publication.  It was published in the UK in 1974 by Blond & Briggs, with reprints in 1997, 1979 (twice) and 1980 by Star.

Critical reception
Love All was reviewed by the Daily Telegraph which said that it was "written with the lightest of touches and a mirthful exhilarated sense of its own libidousness...quite the funniest novel I have read in a long while". Another review, in the Irish Times, in a reference to the sexual content of the book, called it "disgusting".

References

External links
Molly Parkin's personal website

1974 British novels
Blond & Briggs books
1974 debut novels